The Dallas Derby Devils (DDD) is a flat track roller derby league in Dallas, Texas and surrounding area of Ft. Worth, Texas. Founded in November 2004, the Dallas Derby Devils is the original North Texas roller derby league with a current roster of over one hundred active skaters, making DDD one of the largest flat track derby leagues in the southern United States. The Dallas Derby Devils are an original member of the Women's Flat Track Derby Association (WFTDA).

The Dallas Derby Devils have completed sell-out home seasons since 2006 featuring the five home teams that comprise the league; The Death Row Rumblers, The High Seas Hotties, The Slaughterers, The Suicide Shifters, and The Wrecking Crew. Skaters of these five teams make up an All-Star Travel Team for the Dallas Derby Devils called the Army of Darkness, that compete in interleague play against other WFTDA member leagues.

Since 2008, league games are held at the NYTEX Sports Centre in North Richland Hills, Texas.

The Dallas Derby Devils is a skater-owned and skater-operated 501(c)3 Domestic Non-Profit organization.

Teams
The Dallas Derby Devils has 7 teams: an all-star travel team known as the Army of Darkness an all-star b-team the Battalion of Doom, and five home teams, the Death Row Rumblers, the High Seas Hotties, the Slaughters, the Suicide Shifters and the Wrecking Crew.

In 2018, the league integrated the Rolling Rebellion, a junior roller derby team competing in JRDA tournaments. This expanded Dallas' program to include youth ages 7-17 years of age. 

Upon the return to gameplay from COVID-19 restrictions in 2021, the Dallas Derby Devils developed the Hellraisers. This open-gender team competes under the WFTDA and USA Roller Sports (USARS) rulesets. The Hellraisers is a reboot of the beloved original Dallas Derby Devils travel team, the Hell Razors.

Dallas Derby Devils Home Team Champions

WFTDA competition

The Dallas Derby Devils' all-star travel team is called the Army of Darkness, and is composed of 20 members from all five of the Dallas Derby Devils home teams. Army of Darkness competes in interleague game play with other WFTDA member leagues. Dallas also fields an all-star b-team called the Battalion of Doom.

Dallas has made various appearances at WFTDA Playoffs over the years. In 2013, Dallas competed at the first Division 2 Playoff, held in Des Moines, Iowa. Dallas entered the tournament as the ninth seed, and finished the weekend in fifth place. In 2015, Dallas hosted a Division 1 Playoff tournament, for which they themselves also qualified. They entered the weekend as the sixth seed, and finished in fifth place. In 2016, Dallas returned to Division 1 Playoffs in Montreal, entering as the fifth seed and finishing in the same position. In 2017, Dallas again hosted a Division 1 playoff, at which they won their opening game in the final jam, 170-162 over Santa Cruz Derby Girls. Dallas then lost their quarterfinal to Texas Rollergirls 248-89, and finished their weekend with a consolation round win over Arizona Roller Derby of 183-153.

In 2018, Dallas was eligible for Playoffs with a ranking of 27 overall in the June 30 rankings update, but declined their invitation to Playoffs.

Dallas was not eligible for Playoffs in the June 2019 rankings update. 

There was no competitive WFTDA roller derby from 2020 through 2022 due to restrictions put in place as a result of COVID-19. Competitive ranked gameplay returns in 2023.

Rankings

 CR = consolation round
 DNP = did not play
 COVID-19 = as a result of restrictions, no WFTDA derby was played

References

External links 
Dallas Derby Devils
Women's Flat Track Derby Association (WFTDA)

Roller derby leagues in Texas
Women's sports in the United States
Women's Flat Track Derby Association Division 1
Roller derby leagues established in 2004
2004 establishments in Texas